The United Kingdom was represented by Emma in the Eurovision Song Contest 1990 with the song "Give a Little Love Back to the World".

Before Eurovision

A Song for Europe 1990 
The eight songs in contention to represent the UK were presented during Terry Wogan's Wogan chat show on BBC1. Two songs were presented during each of four broadcasts between 21 and 28 March. The songs were also featured in various programmes on BBC Radio 2.

A separate results show was broadcast on BBC1 the same evening. BBC Radio 2 simulcast the final and also broadcast the results show, both with commentary by Ken Bruce.

Final
The 1990 edition of A Song for Europe was held in Television Centre, London on 30 March in Studio 1. The BBC Concert Orchestra under the direction of Alyn Ainsworth as conductor accompanied all the songs, but despite performing live, the orchestra were off-screen, behind the set. Terry Wogan presided over the eight finalists and a panel of celebrities was assembled to comment on each of the entries. The panel was composed of Gloria Hunniford, Tim Rice, Cathy McGowan and Carl Davis.

As in the last two years, a national telephone vote decided the outcome of the contest. Emma won with a runaway phone poll of 97,625 calls over John Miles, who polled 38,966.

UK Discography 
Kelly - Better Be Good to Me: Loading Bay LBAY25 (B Side).
Emma - Give a Little Love Back to the World: Big Wave BWR33 (7" Single)/BWRT33 (12" Single)/BWRCD33 (CD Single)/BWRC33 (Cassette).

At Eurovision
The final was held in Zagreb, Yugoslavia on 5 May. Emma was supported by several backing singers including Miriam Stockley (later a backing vocalist for Katrina and the Waves in 1997) and Sam Blue (who competed against Katrina and the Waves in the 1997 national final). Despite being one of the favourites to win, "Give a Little Love Back to the World" had to settle for sixth place with 87 points. The British jury voting was quite idiosyncratic awarding no points to Italy or France (unlike neighbours Ireland who gave Italy 12 points and France 8) and 12 points to Iceland who finished 4th as well as awarding Ireland 10 points.

Voting

References

1990
Countries in the Eurovision Song Contest 1990
Eurovision
Eurovision